My Soul to Keep is a 1997 novel by American writer Tananarive Due. It is the first book in Due's African Immortals Series and was followed by The Living Blood (2001). The third book in the series, Blood Colony, was published in 2008.

Adaptation
In 2004, it was announced that a film version of this book is in production with actor Blair Underwood.

Reviews
 Joy R. Sewing, "'My Soul to Keep' satisfies after good scare", Houston Chronicle (1997)
 Review on DarkEcho by Paula Guran
 Nehanda Imara, "What Price Eternity?", Metroactive Books (1997)

References

External links
 Excerpt from 'My Soul to Keep'
Interviews
 TANANARIVE DUE: Unique Name for a New Dark Star by Paula Guran on DarkEcho.com (1997) 
 Tananarive Due: 'My Soul to Keep' on NPR, All Things Considered, October 31, 1997 (Audio)

1997 American novels
American horror novels
Novels by Tananarive Due
HarperCollins books
African-American novels